Phan Rang–Tháp Chàm, commonly known as Phan Rang, is a city in Vietnam and the capital of Ninh Thuận Province. The community has a population of 161,000 (2004), of which 91,000 (2004) live in the main city.

The name Phan Rang is the Vietnamese pronunciation of Panduranga (a Sanskrit word of Hindu origin). The name Tháp Chàm means "Cham Temple/Tower" and is named after the Po Klong Garai Temple in the northern part of the city.

History
What is now Phan Rang was formerly known as Panduranga, the capital of the kingdom of Champa from 757 to 854. In 813 the Panduranga Principality was founded and the Champa king granted it local autonomy. It was annexed by the Vietnamese in 1832, marking the fall of the last Champa Kingdom. The city name Phan Rang or Panran is an indigenous Austronesianized form of original Sanskrit Panduranga, first appeared on Cham inscriptions around the tenth century as Paṅrauṅ.

The town of Phan Rang was established in 1917 during the Nguyễn dynasty, by edict of Emperor Khải Định, and remained the provincial capital of Ninh Thuận Province until 1976, when the province merged with Bình Thuận Province to form Thuận Hải Province.

When the Japanese occupied the country in World War II, they established an airfield and it was later used by the French. During the Republic of Vietnam, Phan Rang was the site of the United States Air Force's Phan Rang Air Base in the Vietnam War.

The town was divided into Phan Rang in the east, which became part of Ninh Hải District and Tháp Chàm in the west, which became part of An Son district. The two were again combined in 1992 to become Phan Rang–Tháp Chàm, the capital of Ninh Thuận Province, achieving city status in 2007.

Culture

Cham

Tháp Chàm and Phan Rang district has become a center for the maintenance of Cham culture. Much of the district is occupied by Cham people where they have rice paddies, orchards of grapes and peaches, flocks of goats and Brahman cattle. Their towers (the 'Thap') are beautiful memorials to their kings and queens. There are several Cham sites with dilapidated towers along the central coast of Vietnam and major sites in Mỹ Sơn and Nha Trang.

However, there are two sites in the Phan Rang–Tháp Chàm being maintained and culturally active. Two kilometers west of the Tháp Chàm Railway Station, there is excellent hilltop Cham tower complex dedicated to the king Po Klong Garai, the last reigning king; his likeness is depicted on a lingam in the sanctuary of the central tower. A second tower for the king Po Re Do is located about 20 km south west of Tháp Chàm, via Phu Quy to Phouc Hou and the village Hau Sanh; this tower is undergoing extensive renovation (July 2012).

The towers are currently used for the very colorful Cham festivals, particularly "Kate" in October (Oct 15 in 2012) when they still sacrifice a bullock and other food offerings. Other ceremonies for Ramadan, a Rain Festival (as required), weddings and other celebrations are also held. Apart from the incorporation of Islam into their cultural and religious practice, another point of cultural difference is that their heredity line is maternal. The animist foundation of Cham culture, with fire motif on the towers, rustic traditions and very colorful ceremonial dress makes the Cham culture an ideal tourist resource for Vietnam, as yet poorly developed.

Architecturally, the towers are intricately built in small red bricks, almost dry stone construction with very fine mortar lines. The towers are topped by calyx like minarets, arches are rimmed by special bricks fired with tongue like extensions on the extremities to represent flames; it is very intricate brick work requiring sophisticated engineering to deal with the overhang.

Associated with the Po Klong Garai complex there is a cultural center, more functionally built with concrete, bricks, mortar and render, but at least with some of the line of the Cham architecture and housing a display of cultural and handi-works, and excellent photographs and paintings by Cham artists.

Transport
Phan Rang–Tháp Chàm is located at the junction of National Routes 1A and 27; the former connects the town to Hanoi towards the north and Ho Chi Minh City to the south-west, while the latter crosses into the Central Highlands towards Buôn Ma Thuột. 

The city is connected to the North–South Railway at Tháp Chàm Railway Station; express passenger trains (SE1/2, SE5/6) stop regularly at the station.
Getting to or from the Tháp Chàm Station
21 Thang 8 connects Tháp Chàm to Phan Rang. Local buses go west(7 km ride) to Phan Rang bus terminal, near the Phan Rang market. The Phan Rang terminal is the hub for local and distance buses. Local buses go to Phu Quy and Phouc Hou (12 km) for the Po Re Do tower or the beach resorts (5 km). 
Taking the opposite direction (west) on 21 Thang 8, 1 km gets to the Po Klong Garai towers and cultural center.
Mini-buses to Da Lat (2.5hr. trip) pick up passengers from a Tháp Chàm booking office on 21 Thang 8 between the intersection and railway crossing, however, passengers can more reliably get seats at the Phan Rang terminus.

Đà Lạt–Tháp Chàm Railway
The station once served as a terminus for the Đà Lạt–Tháp Chàm Railway, a rack railway which opened in 1932. The railway was abandoned during the Vietnam War and dismantled after the North Vietnamese victory in 1975, to provide materials for the restoration of the heavily damaged north–south line. A proposed renewal project, backed by provincial and local governments, aims to restore the entire Đà Lạt–Tháp Chàm railway to handle both passenger and cargo transportation.

Notable residents
 Al Hoang (Phan Rang) – former member of the Houston City Council and first Vietnamese American member
 Nguyễn Văn Thiệu - former President of South Vietnam from 1967 to 1975

References

External links

Populated places in Ninh Thuận province
Districts of Ninh Thuận province
Provincial capitals in Vietnam
Cities in Vietnam